South Carolina Highway 165 (SC 165) is a  state highway in the U.S. state of South Carolina. It connects Yonges Island to U.S. Route 17 (US 17) in Ravenel and US 17 Alternate in Summerville.

Route description

SC 165 begins at the entrance to Stevens Towing Co., Inc. along the banks of the Wadmalaw River on Yonges Island. It heads west-southwest before curving to the northwest. In Meggett, it passes the city hall before it intersects SC 162 in Hollywood. In Ravenel, it crosses over a CSX Transportation railway and intersects US 17 (Savannah Highway). After leaving Ravenel, the highway becomes a very rural route. It stays this way until it intersects SC 61 (Ashley River Road) just southwest of Summerville. It then transitions to a congested urban highway from that intersection until its northern terminus. A short distance later, it intersects SC 642 (Dorchester Road). It follows the Berlin G. Myers Parkway for the rest of its route. In Summerville, it intersects US 78 (East 5th North Street), before it curves to the northwest to meet its northern terminus, and intersection with US 17 Alternate (N. Main Street) and Berkeley Circle.

History
Established in 1939 as a new primary highway, SC 165 originally traversed  from its current southern terminus to US 17 in Ravenel. This section has remained relatively unchanged; with an exception in Hollywood, where it was realigned in the 1980s, removing a concurrency with SC 162 and leaving Town Council Road.

Around 1952, SC 165 was extended north on mostly new construction to Cooks Crossroads, where it then replaced SC 61 going north into Summerville. Going northwest out of Summerville, it ended at US 78 in an area originally known as Brownsville. In 2000, SC 165 was removed from downtown Summerville, and was rerouted onto Berlin G. Myers Parkway and went northeast to its current northern terminus at US 17 Alternate.

Future
Dorchester County currently has plans to add additional lanes to SC 165 from SC 61 (Ashley River Road) to Berlin G. Myers Parkway.

Major intersections

See also

References

External links

SC 165 at Virginia Highways' South Carolina Highways Annex

165
Transportation in Charleston County, South Carolina
Transportation in Dorchester County, South Carolina
Transportation in Berkeley County, South Carolina
Summerville, South Carolina